Columbella fuscata, common name burnt dove shell, is a species of sea snail, a marine gastropod mollusk in the family Columbellidae, the dove snails.

Description

Distribution
This species is present in Baja California, from Mexico to Peru and in the Galápagos.

Bibliography
 Monsecour K. (2010). Checklist of Columbellidae.
 Petit, R. E. (2009). George Brettingham Sowerby, I, II & III: their conchological publications and molluscan taxa. Zootaxa. 2189: 1–218.
 R S Houston -  THE STRUCTURE AND FUNCTION OF NEOGASTROPOD REPRODUCTIVE SYSTEMS WITH SPECIAL REFERENCE TO Columbella-fuscata - Veliger 1976 19:27-46

References

External links
 Animal Base

Columbellidae
Gastropods described in 1832